Miguel Ángel Cuello (February 27, 1946 – September 14, 1999) was an Argentinian professional boxer in the light heavyweight (175 lb) division. He was born in Elortondo, Santa Fe, Argentina.

Amateur career

Cuello represented Argentina as a light heavyweight at the 1972 Munich Olympic Games. His results were:

 Defeated Ottomar Sachse (East Germany) 4–1
 Defeated Marin Culineac (Romania) TKO 2
 Lost to Mate Parlov (Yugoslavia) walkover

Professional career

Cuello turned professional in 1973 after a successful amateur career and won the vacant WBC Light Heavyweight title in 1977 with a KO over Jesse Burnett. He lost the title in his first defense against Mate Parlov by KO. He retired after the loss, the only professional loss of his career.

Professional boxing record

See also
List of light-heavyweight boxing champions

References

External links

1946 births
1999 deaths
People from General López Department
Boxers at the 1972 Summer Olympics
Olympic boxers of Argentina
Argentine male boxers
Light-heavyweight boxers
World light-heavyweight boxing champions
World Boxing Council champions
Sportspeople from Santa Fe Province